Positronium (Ps) is a system consisting of an electron and its anti-particle, a positron, bound together into an exotic atom, specifically an onium.  Unlike hydrogen, the system has no protons.  The system is unstable: the two particles annihilate each other to predominantly produce two or three gamma-rays, depending on the relative spin states.  The energy levels of the two particles are similar to that of the hydrogen atom (which is a bound state of a proton and an electron). However, because of the reduced mass, the frequencies of the spectral lines are less than half of those for the corresponding hydrogen lines.

States

The mass of positronium is 1.022 MeV, which is twice the electron mass minus the binding energy of a few eV. The lowest energy orbital state of positronium is 1S, and like with hydrogen, it has a hyperfine structure arising from the relative orientations of the spins of the electron and the positron.

The singlet state,  with antiparallel spins (S = 0, Ms = 0) is known as para-positronium (p-Ps).

Para-positronium lifetime in vacuum is approximately

The triplet states, 3S1, with parallel spins (S = 1, Ms = −1, 0, 1) are known as ortho-positronium (o-Ps), and have an energy that is approximately 0.001 eV higher than the singlet. Other modes of decay are negligible; for instance, the five-photons mode has branching ratio of ≈.

Ortho-positronium lifetime in vacuum can be calculated approximately as:

Positronium in the 2S state is metastable having a lifetime of  against annihilation. The positronium created in such an excited state will quickly cascade down to the ground state, where annihilation will occur more quickly.

Measurements 
Measurements of these lifetimes and energy levels have been used in precision tests of quantum electrodynamics, confirming quantum electrodynamics (QED) predictions to high precision.

The annihilation into a neutrino–antineutrino pair is also possible, but the probability is predicted to be negligible. The experimental upper limits on branching ratio for this decay (as well as for a decay into any "invisible" particles) are < for p-Ps and < for o-Ps.

Energy levels 

While precise calculation of positronium energy levels uses the Bethe–Salpeter equation or the Breit equation, the similarity between positronium and hydrogen allows a rough estimate.  In this approximation, the energy levels are different because of a different effective mass, m*, in the energy equation (see electron energy levels for a derivation):

where:

  is the charge magnitude of the electron (same as the positron),
  is the Planck constant,
  is the electric constant (otherwise known as the permittivity of free space),

Thus, for positronium, its reduced mass only differs from the electron by a factor of 2. This causes the energy levels to also roughly be half of what they are for the hydrogen atom.

So finally, the energy levels of positronium are given by

The negative sign is a convention that implies a bound state. Positronium can also be considered by a particular form of the two-body Dirac equation; Two particles with a Coulomb interaction can be exactly separated in the (relativistic) center-of-momentum frame and the resulting ground-state energy has been obtained very accurately using finite element methods of Janine Shertzer and confirmed more recently. The Dirac equation whose Hamiltonian comprises two Dirac particles and a static Coulomb potential is not relativistically invariant. Only the leading term is included. The  contribution is the Breit term; workers rarely go to  because at  one has the Lamb shift, which requires quantum electrodynamics.

Formation and decay in materials 
After a radioactive atom in a material undergoes a β+ decay (positron emission), the resulting high-energy positron slows down by colliding with atoms, and eventually annihilates with one of the many electrons in the material. It may however first form positronium before the annihilation event. The understanding of this process is of some importance in positron emission tomography. Approximately:
 ~60% of positrons will directly annihilate with an electron without forming positronium. The annihilation usually results in two gamma rays. In most cases this direct annihilation occurs only after the positron has lost its excess kinetic energy and has thermalized with the material.
 ~10% of positrons form para-positronium, which then promptly (in ~0.12 ns) decays, usually into two gamma rays.
 ~30% of positrons form ortho-positronium but then annihilate within a few nanoseconds by 'picking off' another nearby electron with opposing spin. This usually produces two gamma rays. During this time, the very lightweight positronium atom exhibits a strong zero-point motion, that exerts a pressure and is able to push out a tiny nanometer-sized bubble in the medium.
 Only ~0.5% of positrons form ortho-positronium that self-decays (usually into three gamma rays). This natural decay rate of ortho-positronium is relatively slow (~140 ns decay lifetime), compared to the aforementioned pick-off process, which is why the three-gamma decay rarely occurs.

History 

Stjepan Mohorovičić predicted the existence of positronium in a 1934 article published in Astronomische Nachrichten, in which he called it the "electrum". Other sources incorrectly credit Carl Anderson as having predicted its existence in 1932 while at Caltech. It was experimentally discovered by Martin Deutsch at MIT in 1951 and became known as positronium.  Many subsequent experiments have precisely measured its properties and verified predictions of quantum electrodynamics.  There was a discrepancy known as the ortho-positronium lifetime puzzle that persisted for some time, but was eventually resolved with further calculations and measurements. Measurements were in error because of the lifetime measurement of unthermalised positronium, which was only produced at a small rate. This had yielded lifetimes that were too long. Also calculations using relativistic quantum electrodynamics are difficult to perform, so they had been done to only the first order.  Corrections that involved higher orders were then calculated in a non-relativistic quantum electrodynamics.

Exotic compounds 

Molecular bonding was predicted for positronium.  Molecules of positronium hydride (PsH) can be made.  Positronium can also form a cyanide and can form bonds with halogens or lithium.

The first observation of di-positronium molecules—molecules consisting of two positronium atoms—was reported on 12 September 2007 by David Cassidy and Allen Mills from University of California, Riverside.

Natural occurrence 

The events in the early universe leading to baryon asymmetry predate the formation of atoms (including exotic varieties such as positronium) by around a third of a million years, so no positronium atoms occurred then.

Likewise, the naturally occurring positrons in the present day result from high-energy interactions such as in cosmic ray–atmosphere interactions, and so are too hot (thermally energetic) to form electrical bonds before annihilation.

Positronium in very weakly bound (extremely large n) states has been predicted to be the dominant form of atomic matter in the universe in the far future if proton decay occurs. Although any positrons and electrons left over from the decay of matter would be initially moving far too fast to bind together, the expansion of the universe slows free particles, so much so that eventually (in  years, when electrons and positrons are typically 1 quintillion parsecs apart) their kinetic energy will actually fall below the Coulomb attraction potential, and thus they will be weakly bound (positronium). The resulting weakly bound electron and positron spiral inwards and eventually annihilate, with an estimated lifetime of  years.

See also 
 Breit equation
 Antiprotonic helium
 Di-positronium
 Quantum electrodynamics
 Protonium
 Two-body Dirac equations

References

External links 
 The Search for Positronium
 Obituary of Martin Deutsch, discoverer of Positronium
 Website about positrons, positronium and antihydrogen. Positron Laboratory, Como, Italy

Molecular physics
Quantum electrodynamics
Spintronics
Onia
Antimatter
Substances discovered in the 1950s